The Rough Guide to the Music of Kenya and Tanzania is a world music compilation album originally released in 1996. Part of the World Music Network Rough Guides series, it focuses on the music of Kenya and Tanzania, two countries which share Swahili as a common language. The release was compiled by Phil Stanton, co-founder of the World Music Network. Artwork was designed by Impetus.

Chris Nickson of AllMusic gave the album four stars, stating that while it may not be perfectly all-inclusive, it serves as an "excellent introduction" to the region's music. Michaelangelo Matos, writing for the Chicago Reader, named it as his favourite of the early Rough Guide albums, describing the record as "close to perfect."

Track listing

References

External links 
 

1996 compilation albums
World Music Network Rough Guide albums
Albums by Kenyan artists
Albums by Tanzanian artists